Diego Ramírez Sedeño de Fuenleal (1524 – 27 January 1573) was a Roman Catholic prelate who served as Bishop of Pamplona (1561–1573).

Biography
Diego Ramírez Sedeño de Fuenleal was born in 1524 in Villaescusa de Haro, Spain. On 13 June 1561, he was appointed during the papacy of Pope Pius IV as Bishop of Pamplona. He served as Bishop of Pamplona until his death on 27 January 1573. While bishop, he was the principal consecrator of Francisco Delgado López, Bishop of Lugo (1562); and Sebastián Lartaún, Bishop of Cuzco (1571).

References 

16th-century Roman Catholic bishops in Spain
Bishops appointed by Pope Pius IV
1524 births
1573 deaths